Les, Leslie or Lesley Thompson may refer to:

Leslie Thompson (skier) (born 1963), American cross country skier
Leslie Thompson (musician) (1901–1987), Jamaican jazz trumpeter
Leslie Thompson (cricketer) (1908–1990), English cricketer
Leslie A. Thompson (1806–1874), Florida Supreme Court Justice
Lesley Thompson (born 1959), Canadian coxswain
Les Thompson (Australian footballer) (1928–2018), Australian footballer for Collingwood
two English association football players:
Les Thompson (footballer, born 1968), played for Hull City, Scarborough, Maidstone United and Burnley
Les Thompson (footballer, born 1988), played for Stockport County

See also
Lesley Thomson (disambiguation)